Variety (German title: Varieté ) is a 1935 French-German drama film directed by Nicolas Farkas and starring Annabella, Hans Albers and Attila Hörbiger. It is based on the 1912 novel  The Oath of Stephan Huller by Felix Hollaender. It features a love triangle between three performers of a high wire act.

It was shot at the Bavaria Studios in Munich and the Joinville Studios in Paris. The film's sets were designed by the art director Serge Piménoff. A separate French-language film  was also produced. The following year a British remake Three Maxims was produced by Herbert Wilcox and starred Anna Neagle.

Cast
 Annabella as Jeanne 
 Hans Albers as Pierre 
 Attila Hörbiger as Georges 
 Karl Etlinger as Max 
 Ernst Rotmund as Varieté-Direktor 
 Gerhard Dammann as Varieté-Regisseur 
 Gustav Püttjer as Emil 
 Else Reval as Frau Thomas 
 Arthur Reinhardt as Der Pressechef 
 Walter Steinweg as Ein Schneider 
 Nicolas Koline as Gänsemann 
 Gaston Palmer as Ein Jongleur

References

Bibliography 
 Bock, Hans-Michael & Bergfelder, Tim. The Concise CineGraph. Encyclopedia of German Cinema. Berghahn Books, 2009.

External links 
 

1935 films
German drama films
1935 drama films
1930s German-language films
Films of Nazi Germany
Films directed by Nicolas Farkas
Circus films
Bavaria Film films
German multilingual films
French multilingual films
German black-and-white films
French black-and-white films
French drama films
1935 multilingual films
Films shot at Bavaria Studios
Films shot at Joinville Studios
Remakes of German films
Sound film remakes of silent films
1930s French films
1930s German films